The R934 road is a regional road in Ireland which links the M1 motorway with the R132 regional road in Dundalk in County Louth.

See also 

 Roads in Ireland
 National primary road
 National secondary road

References 

Regional roads in the Republic of Ireland

Roads in County Louth